The  is an incomplete national expressway in Toyama Prefecture and Ishikawa Prefecture. It is owned and operated primarily by the Ministry of Land, Infrastructure, Transport and Tourism (MLIT), but also has sections maintained and tolled by the Toyama and Ishikawa Prefecture Road Corporations. The route is signed E41 under MLIT's  "2016 Proposal for Realization of Expressway Numbering" and also as National Route 470.

References

External links
 Ishikawa Prefectural Road Public Corporation
 Toyama Prefectural Road Public Corporation

ja:能越自動車道#国道470号
470
Expressways in Japan
Roads in Ishikawa Prefecture
Roads in Toyama Prefecture